Fayette Regional Air Center  is a county-owned public-use airport in unincorporated Fayette County, Texas, United States, located two miles (3 kilometers) west of the central business district of the City of La Grange.

Facilities and aircraft 
For the 12-month period ending June 5, 2007, the airport had 9,000 general aviation aircraft operations, an average of 24 per day. There are 30 aircraft based at this airport: 83% single-engine, 13% multi-engine and 3% jet.

References

External links 
 Fayette Regional Air Center page at Fayette County web site 
 
 

Airports in Texas
Transportation in Fayette County, Texas
Buildings and structures in Fayette County, Texas